Furong Cave is a karst cave located on the banks of the Furong River,  from the seat of Wulong District, Chongqing, People's Republic of China.

History
First discovered by local farmers in 1993 the cave was opened to tourists in 1994. It became a national 4A tourist site in 2002 then in June 2006 part of the South China Karst UNESCO World Heritage Site ; the only cave in China on the UNESCO list.

In 1994, 1996 and 2001, cave experts from countries including China, the UK, USA, Ireland and Australia undertook comprehensive explorations of the cave.

Description
Inside, the cave is divided into three sections, with the first featuring colorful subterranean features. The remaining two areas  focus on the science of cave formation.

Formed during the Cambrian/Ordovician Periods some 500 million years ago, the cave features numerous rarely found speleothems including coral and dog-tooth like crystalline calcite flowers as well as a variety of helictites, and crystalline gypsum flowers.

See also
Xueyu Cave
Three Natural Bridges
South China Karst

References

External links
—China Radio International: "Furong Cave, Chongqing"
 Cam111.com: Furong Cave — photos gallery

Caves of Chongqing
Karst caves
Karst formations of China
1993 archaeological discoveries
Tourist attractions in Chongqing